Mariana Sansón Argüello (June 6, 1918 – May 6, 2002) was one of the foremost poets  in the history of Nicaragua.  She produced a personal and metaphysical poetry that is recognized as a type of Hispanic American surrealism

Biography
Sansón Argüello was born in León, Nicaragua. Her parents were Joaquín Sansón Balladares and Evangelina Argüello Prado. Her father's carnal  aunt was the 1931 President of the Nicaraguan Feminist League, 1959 Woman of the Americas, and   1969 Nicaraguan Congressional Medal of Honour laureate Angélica Balladares de Argüello, (December 19, 1872 – September 8, 1973). Sansón Argüello studied in La Asunción of León. She was first married to Eduardo Argüello Cervantes. After Eduardo's death she remarried with Dr. Edgardo Buitrago Buitrago on March 26, 1967.

Argüello, similar to those artists from the Renaissance period in Italy, was a complete artist. She was a poet, a writer, a painter, a clothing designer and a plastic artist. She was the first woman to form part of the Nicaragua Academy of Language and was a very known painting professor. She was also mother to three children: María José Argüello, Jorge Eduardo Argüello and Ana Cecilia Argüello. They all inherited the artistic vein.

Some of her published books are Poemas, Horas y sus Voces, and Zoo Fantástico.

Translations
 Francesco Sensidoni

References 

 Book "Doña Angelica Balladares de Arguello,La primera dama del Liberalismo", by Francisco Obando Somarriba, Ed. Managua, 1969

External links

https://web.archive.org/web/20070922050938/http://artecabrera.com.ar/biosanson.php

https://web.archive.org/web/20071207213741/http://www-ni.laprensa.com.ni/archivo/2000/octubre/12/opinion/opinion-20001012-02.html

1918 births
2002 deaths
20th-century Nicaraguan poets
People from León, Nicaragua
20th-century women writers
Nicaraguan women poets